The Bladensburg Road-Anacostia Line, designated as Route B2, is a daily bus route operated by the Washington Metropolitan Area Transit Authority between Anacostia station of the Green Line of the Washington Metro & Mount Rainier Terminal in Mount Rainier. Route B2 operates every 10–20 minutes at all times. B2 trips are roughly 56 minutes to complete.

Background
Route B2 operates daily between Mount Rainier terminal and Anacostia station mostly operating along Bladensburg Road. Additional school trips from Eastern High School are also operated during school days. This route connects Mount Rainier and Anacostia residents by bus without having to take the train between the two points.

Route B2 currently operates out of Bladensburg division. Select weekday peak-hour trips are operated by Shepherd Parkway.

History
B2 initially started off as a streetcar line in 1910, operating between Mount Rainier, MD, Municipal Place & Rhode Island Avenue & the Anacostia neighborhood of Southeast Washington D.C. The B2 streetcar line was later replaced by buses in 1923 and eventually became a Metrobus Route on February 4, 1973 when WMATA acquired four private bus companies that operated throughout the Washington D.C. Metropolitan Area and merged them all together to form its own, "Metrobus" System. Route B2 kept operating on the same exact routing as its streetcar route after.

On July 15, 1977 when both Stadium Armory & Potomac Avenue stations opened, B2 began serving both Metrorail Stations in the middle of its route. There were no major changes on its routing however.

On December 28, 1991, when Anacostia station opened, B2 was extended from its original Anacostia terminus at the intersection of W Street SE & 16th Street SE, to operate to the new Anacostia station in the adjacent neighborhood of Barry Farm in Southeast Washington D.C.

In 2001 when a roundabout was constructed at the intersection of Rhode Island Avenue, 34th Street, & Perry Street in Mount Rainier, MD to replace the original traffic lights at the intersection, B2 was rerouted to enter the roundabout when operating to both Mount Rainier and the Anacostia Metro Station. Since then, the B2 kept its current routing and has not went through any changes.

During the COVID-19 pandemic, the line was reduced to operate on its Saturday supplemental schedule during the weekdays beginning on March 16, 2020. On March 18, 2020, the line was further reduced to operate on its Sunday schedule. On March 21, 2020, weekend service was reduced to operate every 30 minutes. Service was restored to its full service on August 23, 2020.

In February 2021, WMATA proposed to reroute the B2 in order to replace portions of the B8, B9, D6, and H6 which would operate between Fort Lincoln and Union Station via Market Street NE, Fort Lincoln Drive, Eastern Avenue, Bladensburg Road, 14th/15th streets, C/D streets, Stanton Square and Massachusetts Avenue and eliminate service on Eastern Avenue NE (north of Bladensburg Road) and Rhode Island Avenue if WMATA does not get any federal funding.

Incidents
 On July 10, 2010, a Maryland teenager posed as a Metrobus worker stole a bus from Bladensburg division and ran the B2 route picking up passengers before crashing the bus. After the riders got off the bus, the teen drove off before being stopped by police, fleeing the scene, and later getting arrested.
 On December 9, 2012, 27-year-old Javon Foster shot and killed 20-year-old Selina Brown and injured Brown's 23-month-old daughter Kodi on board a B2 bus along Minnesota Avenue SE around 5:40 pm. Foster later fled and went to the home of his other child's mother right after the shooting. Then Foster later drove to Long Island, New York where he later committed suicide two days later.
 On May 13, 2020, a Metropolitan Police Department officer was struck by a B2 Metrobus along Bladensburg Road. The officer suffered serious injuries.

References

B2